Bisigna procerella is a moth of the family Oecophoridae. It is found in Europe.

The wingspan is 11–13 mm. The moth flies from June to August depending on the location.

The larvae feed on lichens on tree-trunks.

References

External links
 Bisigna procerella at UKmoths

Oecophorinae
Moths of Europe
Moths described in 1775